Duri Kepa is an administrative village in the Kebon Jeruk district of Indonesia. It has postal code of 11510. The headman of this administrative villages is Syamsul Huda, M.Si.

See also 
 Kebon Jeruk
 List of administrative villages of Jakarta

References

West Jakarta
Administrative villages in Jakarta